The Lost Leader may refer to:

 The Lost Leader (poem), an 1845 poem by Robert Browning
 The Lost Leader, a 2008 collection of poetry by Mick Imlah

See also
A Lost Leader (disambiguation)